Jacques David Chesney Taylor (born 19 April 1988) is a Kittitian cricketer who plays for the Leeward Islands in West Indian domestic cricket. He is a right-handed all-rounder who bowls off spin.

Before making his debut for the Leewards, Taylor played for the Saint Kitts national side at the 2006 and 2008 Stanford 20/20 competitions, which held full Twenty20 status. He was 18 at the time of his debut. A former Leewards under-19s player, Taylor made his senior debut for the team during the 2010–11 WICB Cup, a limited-overs tournament. His first-class debut came a few months, in the 2010–11 Regional Four Day Competition. Taylor made his maiden first-class half-century in just his third match, making 63 against the Windward Islands.
Taylor also played the role of cricketer Vivian Richards in the bollywood film 83.

References

External links
Player profile and statistics at CricketArchive
Player profile and statistics at ESPNcricinfo

1988 births
Living people
Kittitian cricketers
Leeward Islands cricketers
Saint Kitts representative cricketers
St Kitts and Nevis Patriots cricketers